Quel gran pezzo dell'Ubalda tutta nuda e tutta calda, internationally released as Ubalda, All Naked and Warm (though translated to Spanish as "Ubalda la hermosa, ardiente y fogosa") is a 1972 Italian comedy film directed by Mariano Laurenti.

It gained a great commercial success  and launched the "commedia sexy all'italiana" genre.   Walter Veltroni defined the film a "cult-title" and a title which is "a piece of Italian history".

The main actors Edwige Fenech and Pippo Franco were reunited for the similar Giovannona Long-Thigh, released the following year.

Cast 
Edwige Fenech as Ubalda
Pippo Franco as Olimpio de' Pannocchieschi
Karin Schubert as  Fiamma
Umberto D'Orsi as Master Oderisi
Pino Ferrara as The Irascible Friar
Gino Pagnani as Master Deodato
Alberto Sorrentino as Notary Adone Bellezza
Renato Malavasi as The Doctor 
Dante Cleri as  Cantarano Da Nola
Gabriella Giorgelli as The Girl in the Barn

References

External links

1972 films
Commedia sexy all'italiana
Films directed by Mariano Laurenti
Films scored by Bruno Nicolai
Adultery in films
Films set in the Middle Ages
1970s sex comedy films
1970s Italian-language films
1970s Italian films